The 1979 Individual Long Track World Championship was the ninth edition of the FIM speedway Individual Long Track World Championship. The event was held on 9 September 1979 in Mariánské Lázně in the Czech Republic, which was Czechoslovakia at the time.

The world title was won by Alois Wiesböck of West Germany.

Final Classification 

 E = eliminated (no further ride)
 ef = engine failure

References 

1979
Sport in Czechoslovakia
Speedway competitions in the Czech Republic
Sports competitions in Czechoslovakia
Motor
Motor